The Fourth Political Theory is a book by the Russian philosopher and political analyst Aleksandr Dugin, published in 2009. In the book, Dugin states that he is claiming the foundations for an entirely new political ideology, the fourth political theory, which integrates and supersedes liberal democracy, Marxism, and fascism. In this theory, the main subject of politics is not individualism, class struggle, or nation, but rather Dasein (existence itself).

The book has been cited as an inspiration for Russian policy in events such as the war in Donbas.

Thesis

In the book, Dugin states that he wishes to devise an entirely new political theory to replace what he identifies as the previous three dominant political theories: liberalism, fascism and communism. According to Dugin, his aim is to take elements from all three, 'neutralise and decontaminate' negative aspects such as racism (in the case of fascism) and incorporate them into this new ideology. He refers to this ideology as a 'timeless, non-modern theory' valid for all time.

Dugin views liberalism as having 'defeated all its competitors'. He refers to the derision of the past by liberals and the modern concept of 'progress' as being seriously flawed, going so far as to describe it as racism and even 'moral genocide against the past'.

From the three other political theories, he discards the aspects he finds unacceptable and highlights what he sees as the positive qualities. He combines them to form a new political theory based on the 'ethnos', describing this as ‘the greatest value of the Fourth Political Theory as a cultural phenomenon; as a community of language, religious belief, daily life, and of sharing resources and efforts; as an organic entity’.

Reception 
Commonweal called it "a schizoid mix of Heideggerian-Deleuzian ontology, postmodern relativism, anti-liberal fist-pounding, and megalomaniacal geopolitics".

See also 

 Eurasia Movement
 National Bolshevism
 Third Position

References

External links 
 Official Fourth Political Theory website

Eurasianism
National Bolshevism
Political books
Russian non-fiction books
Political philosophy literature
2009 non-fiction books
Books about fascism
Fascist works
Syncretic political movements
Political spectrum